Symplocos pulchra is a species of plant in the family Symplocaceae. It is endemic to Sri Lanka.

References

 http://www.theplantlist.org/tpl1.1/record/kew-2578753

Endemic flora of Sri Lanka
pulchra